Alan Pell Crawford (born 1953) is an American author and journalist who, in his books and articles, has written on the period of the United States' founding and, in a recent departure, published How Not to Get Rich: The Financial Misadventures of Mark Twain.

His previous book, Twilight at Monticello: The Final Years of Thomas Jefferson, a Washington Post best-seller, casts new light on the retirement of the nation’s third president and author of the Declaration of Independence.

Career
A journalist and political analyst, a former U.S. Senate speechwriter and congressional press secretary, Crawford is also a public speaker, who has spoken at the Union Club of the City of New York, Politics & Prose in Washington, D.C., and the Virginia Center for History and Culture, as well as historical societies and book groups, and been interviewed on the Motley Fool podcast, and Biographers International Organization podcast, as well as Coast to Coast AM. 
Crawford has been a resident scholar at George Washington’s Mount Vernon, at the International Center for Jefferson Studies at Monticello and at the Boston Athenaeum.

His articles, essays and reviews have been published in The New York Times, The Wall Street Journal, The Washington Post'''', the Nation, National Review, and the Weekly Standard.

Crawford first came to national attention in 1977, with an article in The Nation, entitled "Richard Viguerie’s Bid for Power." The first major investigative reporting on the self-described New Right in American politics, the article drew on Crawford’s own experience in Washington’s emerging “conservative movement.” “Richard Viguerie’s Bid for Power” was expanded in book form in Thunder on the Right: The ‘New Right’ and the Politics of Resentment, Crawford’s first book, published in 1980.

Crawford wrote his second book about Ann Cary Randolph Morris entitled Unwise Passions: The True Story of a Remarkable Woman and the First Great Scandal of Eighteenth-Century America, published in 2000, using sources from archives throughout the United States. His third book, Twilight at Monticello, published in 2008, also drew on primary sources to cast new light on the debt-ridden retirement of Thomas Jefferson. The post-presidential years were also those in which Jefferson’s views on a range of important questions—on the nature of constitutional government, on the institution of slavery and on the future of the American experiment in self-government—underwent significant changes. The Associated Press stated that in the Twilight at Monticello  Crawford “had access to thousands of family letters—some previously unexamined by historians—that he used to create his portrait of the complex idealist, [and] there are some surprising tidbits to be found.”

References

Further reading
 "When Paul Weyrich Speaks, Conservatives Listen Up," Los Angeles Times, May 19, 1991. 
 "The High Road to the Whitehouse," The Guardian, July 8, 2008. 
 "Uncouth, Unheeded," The Wall Street Journal'', September 22, 2008.

1953 births
American freelance journalists
American non-fiction writers
Living people